Kobi Hassan (born 26 September 1978) is a retired Israeli footballer who is mostly known for playing at Hapoel Ramat Gan and Maccabi Netanya.

He’s of a Tunisian-Jewish descent.

References

External links

Biography at Hapoel Ramat Gan official website

1978 births
Living people
Israeli Jews
Israeli footballers
Maccabi Netanya F.C. players
Maccabi Sha'arayim F.C. players
Hapoel Ramat Gan F.C. players
Maccabi Herzliya F.C. players
Hakoah Maccabi Amidar Ramat Gan F.C. players
Hapoel Acre F.C. players
Hapoel Nir Ramat HaSharon F.C. players
Maccabi Umm al-Fahm F.C. players
Hapoel Bnei Lod F.C. players
Hapoel Ra'anana A.F.C. players
Hapoel Marmorek F.C. players
Hapoel Herzliya F.C. players
Maccabi Ironi Kiryat Ata F.C. players
Liga Leumit players
Israeli Premier League players
Israeli beach soccer players
Footballers from Netanya
Israeli people of Tunisian-Jewish descent
Association football midfielders